Belarusian Basketball Federation, also known as BBF, is a national governing body of basketball in Belarus.

After the 2022 Russian invasion of Ukraine, FIBA suspended Belarus from participating in basketball and 3x3 basketball competitions. FIBA also banned Belarus from hosting any competitions. Also, FIBA Europe mandated that no official basketball competitions are to be held in Belarus, while the teams of the Belarusian Basketball Federation are withdrawn from national team competitions and from the club competition season 2022-23.

See also 
 Belarus national basketball team
 Belarus women's national basketball team
 Belarusian Premier League

References

External links
Official website
Belarus at FIBA site

Basketball in Belarus
Basketball